Madarangi is a 2013 Indian Kannada-language romantic drama film directed by  Mallikarjun Muthalageri, who previously directed Auto (2009), and starring Krishna, Sushma Raj and Naksha Shetty. The film's title is based on a song from Milana (2007).

Cast 
Krishna as Manu
Sushma Raj 
Naksha Shetty as Deepu
Hanumathe Gowda as Somanna 
Sharath Lohitashwa as Shetty 
Avinash as Deepu's father
Sadhu Kokila
Vinaya Prasad
Suchendra Prasad
Kuri Prathap
Chikkanna
B. B. Ashok Kumar (cameo appearance)

Soundtrack 
The music was composed by J. Anoop Seelin. The song "Darling Darling" became popular before the film released. Arasu Anthare won the Karnataka State Film Award for Best Lyricist for the song "Male Haniye".

Box office 
The film released on the same day as Bulbul (2013) and ran for a hundred days. After this film, Krishna added Darling to his stage name.

Reception 
A critic from Deccan Herald opined that "This “Madarangi” is a fragrant reminder of life's simple, and sometimes savage, pleasures". A critic from The Times of India wrote that "Director Mallikrajuna Muthalageri has selected a good story but does not impress either in script or narration".

References